Independent People (Icelandic: Sjálfstætt fólk),  was an Icelandic television interview and talk show hosted by Jón Ársæll Þórðarson, journalist and psychologist. The program was aired on the TV channel Stöð 2 in Iceland from  2001 to 2015. It has been nominated eight times to the Edda Awards: in 2002, 2006, 2008, 2010 and 2011, and it received the awards in 2003, 2004 and 2005.

Independent People was produced by Steingrímur Jón Þórðarson and Sky Productions and was aired weekly early Sunday nights on Stöð 2 / Channel 2, from September until May.

Jón Ársæll interviewed people of all ages. His youngest was 15-year-old singer Yohanna and the oldest interviewees were in their nineties. Normally, but not always, they were also well known in Iceland.

Guests

References

External links
 

2000s Icelandic television series
2010s Icelandic television series
2007 Icelandic television series debuts
2012 Icelandic television series endings
Television talk shows
Stöð 2 original programming